Chloroclystis permixta is a moth in the family Geometridae. It was described by Prout in 1958. It is found on Java.

References

External links

Moths described in 1958
permixta